Nobel Drive station is a San Diego Trolley station located adjacent to the La Jolla Village Square shopping center in the La Jolla Village district of San Diego, California. after the completion of the Blue Line Mid-Coast Trolley extension project.

Station layout 
There are two tracks, each served by a side platform.

References 

Blue Line (San Diego Trolley)
San Diego Trolley stations in San Diego
Railway stations in the United States opened in 2021